The Kandyan Treaty of 1638 was a treaty between the Kingdom of Kandy and the Dutch Republic signed by King Rajasinghe II and Dutch Naval Commander Adam Westerwold and Vice Commander Willem Jacobszoon Coster of the Dutch East India Company. The treaty was signed on 23 May, 1638 in Batticaloa. The treaty secured the terms under which the two nations would cooperate in defending the Kandyan Kingdom from the Portuguese.

Key content

The Dutch agree to support the king of Kandy to drive the Portuguese from the country.
The Kandyan king would settle Dutch military debt incurred through battle against the Portuguese with commodities such as cinnamon, pepper and beeswax.
Grant the Dutch the monopoly of collecting commodities from the Kandyan areas except for elephants.
Agree to deploy, if the king wished to do so (this phrase was removed in the Sinhala translation in which the Dutch smuggled the king to sign this), the Dutch army at the fortresses that would be captured from the Portuguese.

Kandyan period
Treaties of the Kingdom of Kandy
1638 treaties
Treaties of the Dutch Republic
History of Kandy
Treaties of the Dutch East India Company
1638 in the Dutch Empire